The 1974 Critérium du Dauphiné Libéré was the 26th edition of the cycle race and was held from 3 June to 10 June 1974. The race started in Roanne and finished at Avignon. The race was won by Alain Santy of the Gan–Mercier team.

Teams
Ten teams, containing a total of 100 riders, participated in the race:

 
 
 
 
 
 La Casera–Peña Bahamontes
 Merlin Plage–Shimano–Flandria

Route

General classification

References

1974
1974 in French sport
1974 Super Prestige Pernod
June 1974 sports events in Europe